The Garden of Remembrance is a memorial in honor of over 8,000 Washington state residents who have died in wars since World War II. The memorial includes a passage from Laurence Binyon's poem, "For the Fallen". Designed by Robert Murase, the Garden is located on the Second Street side of Benaroya Hall.

References

Downtown Seattle
Monuments and memorials in Seattle
Vietnam War monuments and memorials in the United States
World War II memorials in the United States